Euphorbia namibensis is a species of plant in the family Euphorbiaceae. It is endemic to Namibia.  Its natural habitat is cold desert.

References

Flora of Namibia
namibensis
Least concern plants
Taxonomy articles created by Polbot